Giffnock and Thornliebank is one of the five wards used to elect members of the East Renfrewshire Council. It elects three Councillors.

Councillors

Election results

2022 election

2017 election

2012 election

2007 election

References

Wards of East Renfrewshire
Giffnock
2007 establishments in Scotland